Lee Jae-gap (also known as Lee Jae-kap; born 27 March 1958) is a South Korean politician currently serving as the Minister of Employment and Labor since his appointment by President Moon Jae-in in September 2018. 

He was previously the deputy head of the Ministry under previous conservative president Lee Myung-bak. He was also the president of its child agency, Korea Workers' Compensation and Welfare Service, under preceding president Park Geun-hye. 

After passing the state exam in 1983, Lee devoted his professional career in public service most of which is at the Ministry.

He holds three degrees - a bachelor and a master's in public administration from Korea University and Seoul National University and a doctorate in labour relations from Michigan State University.

References 

Living people
1958 births
People from Gwangju
Korea University alumni
Michigan State University alumni
Seoul National University alumni
Labor ministers of South Korea